The Satellite Awards are annual awards given by the International Press Academy that are commonly noted in entertainment industry journals and blogs. The awards were originally known as the Golden Satellite Awards. The award ceremonies take place each year at the InterContinental Hotel in Century City, Los Angeles.

Categories

Film
 Best Actor (includes previous drama, musical, and comedy awards) *
 Best Actress (includes previous drama, musical, and comedy awards) *
 Best Animated or Mixed Media Feature
 Best Art Direction and Production Design
 Best Cast (2004–present)
 Best Cinematography
 Best Costume Design
 Best Director
 Best Documentary Film
 Best Editing
 Best Film (includes previous drama, musical, and comedy awards) *
 Best Foreign Language Film
 Best Original Score
 Best Original Song
 Best Screenplay – Adapted
 Best Screenplay – Original
 Best Sound (1999–present)
 Best Supporting Actor (includes previous drama, musical, and comedy awards) *
 Best Supporting Actress (includes previous drama, musical, and comedy awards) *
 Best Visual Effects

In 2011, the IPA combined the Drama and Comedy/Musical film awards into one category, affecting Best Film, Actor, Actress, Supporting Actor and Supporting Actress awards.

Television
 Best Actor – Drama Series
 Best Actor – Musical or Comedy Series
 Best Actor – Miniseries or Television Film
 Best Actress – Drama Series
 Best Actress – Musical or Comedy Series
 Best Actress – Miniseries or Television Film
 Best Cast (or Best Ensemble) (2005–present)
 Best TV Series – Drama
 Best TV Series - Genre
 Best TV Series – Musical or Comedy
 Best Miniseries or Television Film (1996–1998; 2011–2013; 2016)
 Best Miniseries (1999–2009; 2014–2015; 2017–present)
 Best Television Film (1999–2009; 2014–2015; 2017–present)
 Best Supporting Actor (2001–present)
 Best Supporting Actress (2001–present)

New Media
 Outstanding Overall Blu-Ray/DVD
 Outstanding Youth Blu-Ray/DVD
 Outstanding Mobile Game
 Outstanding Platform Action/Adventure Game
 Outstanding Role Playing Game

Special Achievement
 Auteur Award (2005–present)
 Mary Pickford Award (1996–present)
 Nikola Tesla Award (2002–present)
 Humanitarian Award (2010–2012 & 2014–present)
 Outstanding New Talent (1996–2013 & 2016–present)

Ceremonies
 1st Golden Satellite Awards – January 15, 1997
 2nd Golden Satellite Awards – February 22, 1998
 3rd Golden Satellite Awards – January 17, 1999
 4th Golden Satellite Awards – January 16, 2000
 5th Golden Satellite Awards – January 14, 2001
 6th Golden Satellite Awards – January 19, 2002
 7th Golden Satellite Awards – January 12, 2003
 8th Golden Satellite Awards – February 21, 2004
 9th Golden Satellite Awards – January 23, 2005
 10th Satellite Awards – December 17, 2005
 11th Satellite Awards – December 18, 2006
 12th Satellite Awards – December 16, 2007
 13th Satellite Awards – December 14, 2008
 14th Satellite Awards – December 20, 2009
 15th Satellite Awards – December 19, 2010
 16th Satellite Awards – December 18, 2011
 17th Satellite Awards – December 16, 2012
 18th Satellite Awards – February 23, 2014
 19th Satellite Awards – February 15, 2015
 20th Satellite Awards – February 21, 2016
 21st Satellite Awards – February 19, 2017
 22nd Satellite Awards – February 11, 2018
 23rd Satellite Awards – February 17, 2019
 24th Satellite Awards – March 1, 2020
 25th Satellite Awards – February 15, 2021
 26th Satellite Awards – April 2, 2022
 27th Satellite Awards – March 3, 2023

References

External links
 
 International Press Academy website

 
Awards established in 1997
1997 establishments in the United States